"16 @ War" is the debut single from Karina from her debut album First Love. It is produced by Tricky Stewart and The-Dream, and written by them. It has spent 8 weeks on the Hot R&B/Hip-Hop Songs and peaked at #51. It debuted at #93. The song expresses hardships of life from a sixteen-year-old girl's point of view.

Charts

References

2008 debut singles
Karina Pasian songs
Def Jam Recordings singles
Songs with feminist themes
Songs written by The-Dream
2008 songs
Song recordings produced by Tricky Stewart
Songs written by Tricky Stewart